Antonis Karageorgis (born 16 May 1997) is a Greek professional footballer who plays as a centre-back for Super League 2 club Rodos.

References

1997 births
Living people
Greek footballers
AEL Kalloni F.C. players
Rodos F.C. players
Football League (Greece) players
Association football defenders
People from Rhodes
Sportspeople from the South Aegean
21st-century Greek people